Mohamed Masoud may refer to:

 Mohamed Masoud (volleyball) (born 1994), Egyptian volleyball player
 Mohamed Masoud (weightlifter) (born 1984), Egyptian Olympic weightlifter